Diphasia is a genus of hydrozoans belonging to the family Sertulariidae.

The genus has cosmopolitan distribution.

Species

Species:

Diphasia africana 
Diphasia alata 
Diphasia alternata

References

Sertulariidae
Hydrozoan genera